Big Girl may refer to:

Fiction
 Big Girl (film), a 2005 Canadian short film by Renuka Jeyapalan
 Big Girl (novel), a 2010 novel by Danielle Steel
 The Big Girl & Other Stories, a 1964 short-story collection by Alagu Subramaniam

Music
 Big Girl (Candy Dulfer album), 1996, or the title song
 Big Girl (Seyi Shay album), 2021
 "Big Girl (You Are Beautiful)", a 2007 song by Mika
 "Big Girl", a 2000 song by Precocious Brats featuring Kevin & Perry from Kevin & Perry Go Large
 "The Big Girl", a 2018 song by Eureka O'Hara

See also
 "Big Girls", a 1984 song by Electric Pandas
 "Big Girls", a 2009 song by Bow Wow from New Jack City II